China Airlines Flight 206 was a flight operated by a China Airlines NAMC YS-11, registration B-156, that crashed on approach to Taipei Songshan Airport on 12 August 1970. While preparing to land, the aircraft entered thick fog and a severe thunderstorm. Whilst on final approach the plane crashed into a bamboo grove near the top of Yuan Mountain, killing 14 of the 31 people aboard.

References

Aviation accidents and incidents in 1970
Aviation accidents and incidents in Taiwan
Accidents and incidents involving the NAMC YS-11
Airliner accidents and incidents involving fog
Airliner accidents and incidents involving controlled flight into terrain
206
1970 in Taiwan
August 1970 events in Asia
1970 disasters in Taiwan